Konjic woodcarving ( / Коњичко дрворезбарство) is a specific technique of woodcarving practised in Konjic Municipality in Bosnia and Herzegovina.

In 2017 it is included on the UNESCO Representative List of the Intangible Cultural Heritage of Humanity.

History 
Konjic woodcarving is an artistic craft with a long tradition in the Konjic municipality. The woodcarvings – which include furniture, sophisticated interiors and small decorative objects – stand out for their recognizable hand-carved motifs and overall visual identity. The woodcarving is a constitutive part of the local community’s culture, a measure of the beauty and amenity of home interiors, and a tradition that forges a sense of community and belonging.

See also 

 List of World Heritage Sites in Bosnia and Herzegovina

References

External links 
 Konjic Woodcarving listed on the World Heritage List of UNESCO Sarajevo Times, December 7, 2017

Intangible Cultural Heritage of Humanity
Bosnia and Herzegovina culture
Woodcarving